Kirstin Innes (born 1980) is a Scottish novelist and journalist.

Early life 
Innes was born in Edinburgh in 1980, and raised by a single mother. She attended James Gillespie's High School and then University of Aberdeen.

Career 
In 2005, Innes moved to Glasgow to work at The Arches. She also worked as Assistant Editor at The List.

Innes's writing is influenced by her mother and grandmother's left-wing politics.

Innes's debut novel, Fishnet (2019), won The Guardian'''s Not The Booker Prize in 2015 and was praised by The New York Times for its depiction of sex workers as "women with rich inner lives and interests". Innes has written about how her friendship with the sex workers' rights activist Laura Lee influenced the novel.

Her second novel, Scabby Queen, was published by 4th Estate in 2020. It was longlisted for the 2020 Gordon Burn Prize.

In November 2021, Salmander Street will publish Brickwork: A Biography of The Arches'' , co-written by Innes and former The Arches colleague David Bratchpiece.

Personal life 
Innes' partner is the author and playwright Alan Bissett, with whom she has two children. The couple, who met in 2007, have discussed their experiences with IVF publicly with the aim of reducing the stigma around infertility.

Bibliography

References 

1980 births
Living people
21st-century Scottish women writers
21st-century Scottish novelists
Scottish women novelists
Scottish magazine editors
British women journalists
21st-century British journalists
Writers from Edinburgh